The Sicilian Checkmate is a 1972 Italian crime-drama film directed by Florestano Vancini.

Plot  
The construction of a dam in Sicily triggers unspeakable interests and appetites that find immediate repercussions in a feud between two mafia gangs who support two different power groups, one headed by the manufacturer Barresi, who aspires to secure the contract for the works, the other to the engineer Crupi, a wealthy landowner, who would lose his citrus groves following the completion of the project. After a long series of crimes of which not only some members of the rival gangs are the victims, but also many innocent ones, we arrive at the trial that sees the accused representatives of major and minor prominent members of the two mafia organizations. Of the only two defendants determined to confess, one commits suicide in prison, the other is passed off as insane. Thus, only two minor figures pay for all the others, who instead are acquitted.

Cast 
Enrico Maria Salerno: Prosecutor 
Gastone Moschin: Colonnesi, defense attorney 
Riccardo Cucciolla: professor Salemi
Mario Adorf: Amedeo Barrese
Turi Ferro: Judge Nicola Altofascio
Mariangela Melato: Rosaria Licato
Julien Guiomar: Commissioner Golino
Georges Wilson: Crupi
Ciccio Ingrassia: Ferdinando Giacalone
Aldo Giuffrè: Giuseppe Salemi
Ferruccio De Ceresa: Senator 
Michele Abruzzo: Zaccaria
Jeannie Elias: Secretary of Walter
Elio Zamuto: Verzi 
Guido Celano

See also       
 List of Italian films of 1972

References

External links

1972 films
Films directed by Florestano Vancini
1972 crime drama films
Italian crime drama films
Films about the Sicilian Mafia
Films scored by Ennio Morricone
1970s Italian-language films
Films set in Sicily
1970s Italian films